Orville Enoch Hodge (October 1, 1904 – December 29, 1986) was the Auditor of Public Accounts (predecessor to the Office of Comptroller) of the state of Illinois from 1952 to 1956. During his term in office, he embezzled $6.15 million of state funds, mainly by altering and forging checks that were paid on the state's account.

Biography
Hodge was born in Anderson, Indiana, and from the age of four was raised in Granite City, Illinois. He and his family owned land and businesses in that area. In 1946, he married Margaret Coudy of Granite City with whom he had one son.

He was elected to the Illinois House of Representatives, where he served three terms. He was elected Auditor in 1952. He was a Republican.

Embezzlement
His scheme started shortly after his election, when he forged accounting records and created a false paper trail to convince the Illinois General Assembly that his office was insolvent. The legislature gave his office a $525,000 emergency appropriation, which Hodge kept for himself.

With the funds that he stole from the state, Hodge purchased two private jets, 30 automobiles (including a Lincoln, four Cadillacs and a Rolls-Royce imported from Britain), and multiple properties in Florida and Illinois.

The embezzlement scheme was exposed by the Chicago Daily News, whose reporting team (including George Thiem) was awarded a 1957 Pulitzer Prize for their investigation.

Upon indictment, Hodge, who was facing the prospect of spending the rest of his life in prison, agreed to forfeit all of his assets and plead guilty to 54 federal and state charges of bank fraud, fraud, embezzlement, conspiracy to defraud and forgery. He was sentenced to 12 to 15 years in prison.

He was released in 1970 and went to work at his sister's hardware store, then as a car salesman and finally as a real estate agent in Granite City until his death at the age of 82 in Edwardsville, Illinois.

Aftermath
The Hodge scandal played a role in the decision by Illinois lawmakers to abolish the office of the State Auditor in the new state constitution of 1970. The office was replaced by the new office of the Comptroller.

References

External links
History of the Illinois Comptroller's Office
Time article, July 30, 1956
bio and picture in 1953 official Illinois state handbook

1904 births
1986 deaths
American fraudsters
People from Granite City, Illinois
Politicians from Anderson, Indiana
Republican Party members of the Illinois House of Representatives
Auditors of Public Accounts of Illinois
Illinois politicians convicted of crimes
20th-century American politicians